Klovningen is an island in Albert I Land at Spitsbergen, Svalbard. It has an area of about 2.2 km², and is located in the archipelago of Nordvestøyane. Its highest peak is 292 m.a.s.l., and the island is recognizable by a sharp cleft which separates two summits in the northern part.

References

Islands of Svalbard